Albert Butterworth (20 March 1912 – 1991) was an English professional footballer. An outside right, he played in the Football League for Manchester United, Blackpool, Preston North End and Bristol Rovers.

References

1912 births
1991 deaths
Footballers from Ashton-under-Lyne
English footballers
Droylsden F.C. players
Manchester United F.C. players
Blackpool F.C. players
Preston North End F.C. players
Bristol Rovers F.C. players
Association football outside forwards